Birte Siim (born 1945) is a Danish political scientist specializing in gender studies. From 2004 to 2018, she was professor at the Institute for Culture and Global Studies at Aalborg University where she managed FREIA, the Centre of Gender Research. Her numerous books and publications have addressed gender and politics from a European perspective. In addition to coordinating European Union projects, she has been active in the ECPR Standing Group on Gender and Politics.

Biography
Born on 27 November 1945 in Esbjerg, Birte Siim studied political science at Aarhus University, graduating in 1974. In 1975, she joined the university's Department of Community Development and Planning. In 1985, she was a visiting professor at Stanford University's Center for Research on Women and, in spring 2003, at Bristol University's Department of Politics.

In 2004, Siim was appointed Professor of Gender Research in the Social Sciences at Aalborg University's  Department of Culture and Global Studies where she remained until her retirement in 2018. She has participated in several European Union projects including BEUCitizen, RAGE and VEIL.

Selected publications
Siim's many publications address gender and politics, democracy, citizenship and the welfare state:

Recent publications from a European perspective include:
Siim, Birte (2013): "Citizenship" in Oxford Handbook on Gender and Politics, Oxford University Press

Siim, Birte; Rolandsen Agustin, L. (2014): "Gender Diversities – Practicing Intersectionality in the European Union". Ethnicities. (14) 4: 539-555;
Siim, Birte (2014): "Conflicts and Negotiations about Framings of Gender and Ethnicity by Political Actors in the European Public Sphere", Journal of International and Comparative Social Policy, 2014 (30) 01

References

1945 births
Living people
People from Esbjerg
Danish political scientists
20th-century Danish non-fiction writers
21st-century Danish non-fiction writers
Danish women writers
Aarhus University alumni
Academic staff of Aalborg University
Women political scientists